The Grammy Museum is any of a group of museums containing exhibits relating to winners of the Grammy Award for achievement in recording.

The museums in this group include:
The Grammy Museum at L.A. Live, which opened in 2008 in Los Angeles, California
The Grammy Museum Mississippi, which opened in 2016 in Cleveland, Mississippi
The Grammy Museum at Musicians Hall of Fame, Nashville, Tennessee.
The Grammy Museum Experience, which opened in 2017 at Prudential Center, Newark, New Jersey

References

Music museums